Katiperi is a village in Chowdepalli mandal, Chittoor district, Andhra Pradesh, India. Its PIN is 517247. The population is 2083 (1020 male, 1063 female) according to the 2014 census.

References

Villages in Chittoor district